In mathematics, Hilbert's fourth problem in the 1900 list of Hilbert's problems is a foundational question in geometry. In one statement derived from the original, it was to find — up to an isomorphism  — all geometries that have an axiomatic system of the classical geometry (Euclidean, hyperbolic and elliptic), with those axioms of congruence that involve the concept of the angle dropped, and `triangle inequality', regarded as an axiom, added.

If one assumes the continuity axiom in addition, then, in the case of the Euclidean plane, we come to the problem posed by Jean Gaston Darboux: "To determine all the calculus of variation problems in the plane whose solutions are all the plane straight lines."

There are several interpretations of the original statement of David Hilbert. Nevertheless, a solution was sought, with the German mathematician Georg Hamel being the first to contribute to the solution of Hilbert's fourth problem.

A recognized solution was given by Ukrainian mathematician Aleksei Pogorelov in 1973.<ref name="Pogorelov1973">А. В. Погорелов, Полное решение IV проблемы Гильберта, ДАН СССР № 208, т.1 (1973), 46–49. English translation: {{cite journal
| last1=Pogorelov | first1=A. V.
| title=A complete solution of "Hilbert's fourth problem| journal=Doklady Akademii Nauk SSSR
| volume=208
| issue=1
| date=1973
| pages=48—52}}</ref> In 1976, Armenian mathematician Rouben V. Ambartzumian proposed  another proof of Hilbert's fourth problem.

Original statement

Hilbert discusses the existence of non-Euclidean geometry and non-Archimedean geometry

...a geometry in which all the axioms of ordinary euclidean geometry hold, and in particular all the congruence axioms except the one of the congruence of triangles (or all except the theorem of the equality of the base angles in the isosceles triangle), and in which, besides, the proposition that in every triangle the sum of two sides is greater than the third is assumed as a particular axiom.

Due to the idea that a 'straight line' is defined as the shortest path between two points, he mentions how congruence of triangles is necessary for Euclid's proof that a straight line in the plane is the shortest distance between two points. He summarizes as follows:

The theorem of the straight line as the shortest distance between two points and the essentially equivalent theorem of Euclid about the sides of a triangle, play an important part not only in number theory but also in the theory of surfaces and in the calculus of variations. For this reason, and because I believe that the thorough investigation of the conditions for the validity of this theorem will throw a new light upon the idea of distance, as well as upon other elementary ideas, e. g., upon the idea of the plane, and the possibility of its definition by means of the idea of the straight line, the construction and systematic treatment of the geometries here possible seem to me desirable.

Flat metrics

Desargues's theorem:If two triangles lie on a plane such that the lines connecting corresponding vertices of the triangles meet at one point, then the three points, at which the prolongations of three pairs of corresponding sides of the triangles intersect, lie on one line.The necessary condition for solving Hilbert's fourth problem is the  requirement that a metric space that satisfies the axioms of this problem should be Desarguesian, i.e.,:
 if the space is of dimension 2, then the Desargues's theorem and its inverse should hold;
 if the space is of dimension greater than 2, then any three points should lie on one plane.

For Desarguesian spaces Georg Hamel proved that  every solution of Hilbert's fourth  problem can be represented in a real projective space  or in a convex domain of  if one determines  the congruence of segments by equality of their lengths in a special metric for which the lines of the projective space are geodesics.

Metrics of this type are called flat or projective.

Thus, the solution of  Hilbert's fourth problem was reduced to the solution of the problem of constructive determination of all complete flat metrics.

Hamel solved this problem under the assumption of high regularity of the metric. However, as simple examples show, the class of regular flat metrics is smaller than the class of all flat metrics. The axioms of geometries under consideration imply only a continuity of the metrics. Therefore, to solve Hilbert's fourth problem completely it is necessary  to determine  constructively all the continuous flat metrics.

Prehistory of  Hilbert's fourth problem

Before 1900, there was known the Cayley–Klein model of Lobachevsky geometry in the unit disk, according to which geodesic lines are chords of the disk  and the distance between points is defined as a logarithm of the cross-ratio of a quadruple. For two-dimensional Riemannian metrics, Eugenio Beltrami (1835–1900) proved that flat metrics are the metrics of constant curvature.

For multidimensional Riemannian metrics this statement was proved by E. Cartan in 1930.

In 1890, for solving problems on the theory of numbers, Hermann Minkowski introduced a notion of the space that nowadays is called the finite-dimensional Banach space.

 Minkowski space 

Let be a compact convex hypersurface in a Euclidean space defined  by
 

where the function  satisfies the following  conditions:

 
 
 
 and the form  is positively definite.

The length of  the vector OA is defined by:
 

A space with this metric is called Minkowski space.

The hypersurface  is convex and can be irregular. The defined metric is flat.

Finsler spaces

Let M and  be a smooth finite-dimensional manifold and its tangent bundle, respectively. The function  is called Finsler metric if

 ;

 is Finsler space.

 Hilbert's geometry 

Let  be a bounded open convex set with  the boundary of  class C2 and positive normal curvatures. Similarly to the Lobachevsky space, the hypersurface  is called the absolute of Hilbert's geometry.

Hilbert's distance (see fig.) is  defined by
 

 

The metric is symmetric and flat. In 1895, Hilbert introduced this metric as a generalization of  the  Lobachevsky geometry. If the hypersurface  is an ellipsoid, then we have the Lobachevsky geometry.

 Funk metric 
In 1930, Funk introduced a non-symmetric metric. It is defined in a domain bounded by a closed convex hypersurface and is also flat.

σ-metrics

Sufficient condition for flat metrics
Georg Hamel was first to contribute to the solution of Hilbert's fourth problem. He proved the following statement.

Theorem. A regular Finsler metric  is flat if and only if it satisfies the conditions:

 

Crofton formula

Consider a set of all oriented lines on a plane. Then the set of all oriented lines is homeomorphic to a circular cylinder of radius 1 with the area element . Let  be a rectifiable curve on a plane.

Crofton proved this statement in 1870.

A similar statement holds for a projective space.

 Blaschke–Busemann  measure 
In 1966, in his talk at the International Mathematical Congress in Moscow, Herbert Busemann introduced a new class of flat metrics. On a set of lines on the projective plane  he introduced a completely additive non-negative measure , which satisfies the following conditions:

 , where  is a set of straight lines  passing through a point P;
 , where  is a set of straight lines passing through some set X that contains a straight line segment;
  is finite.

If we consider a -metric in an arbitrary convex domain  of a projective space , then condition  3) should be  replaced by the following:
  holds.

 
where  is the set of straight lines that intersect the segment .

The triangle inequality for this metric follows from Pasch's theorem.

But Busemann was far from the idea that -metrics exhaust all flat metrics. He wrote, "The freedom in the choice of a metric with given geodesics is for non-Riemannian metrics so great that it may be doubted whether there really exists a convincing characterization of all Desarguesian spaces".

Two-dimensional case
Pogorelov's theorem
The following theorem was proved by Pogorelov in 1973

Theorem. Any two-dimensional continuous complete flat metric is  a -metric.Thus Hilbert's fourth problem for the two-dimensional case was completely solved.

A consequence of this is that you can glue boundary to boundary two copies of the same planar convex shape, with an angle twist between them, you will get a 3D object without crease lines, the two faces being developable.

 Ambartsumian's proofs
In 1976, Ambartsumian proposed another proof of Hilbert's fourth problem.

His proof uses the fact  that in the two-dimensional case  the whole measure can be restored by its values on biangles, and thus be  defined on triangles in the same way as the area of a triangle is defined on a sphere. However, this structure can not be generalized to higher dimensions because of Hilbert's third problem solved by Max Dehn.

In the two-dimensional case,  polygons with the same volume are scissors-congruent. As was shown by Dehn this is not true for a higher dimension.

Three dimensional case

For three dimensional case Pogorelov proved the following theorem.

Theorem. Any three-dimensional regular complete flat metric is a -metric.However, in the three-dimensional case -measures can take either positive or negative values. The  necessary and sufficient conditions for the regular metric defined by the  function of the set  to be flat are the following three conditions:
 the value  on any plane equals zero,
 the value  in any cone is non-negative,
 the value  is positive if the cone contains interior points.

Moreover, Pogorelov showed that any complete continuous flat metric in the three-dimensional case is the limit of regular -metrics with the uniform convergence on any compact sub-domain of the metric's domain. He called them  generalized -metrics.

Thus Pogorelov could prove the following statement.

Theorem. In the three-dimensional case any complete continuous flat metric is a -metric in generalized meaning.Busemann, in his review to Pogorelov’s book "Hilbert’s Fourth Problem" wrote, "In the spirit of the time Hilbert restricted himself to n = 2, 3 and so does Pogorelov.
However, this has doubtless pedagogical reasons, because he addresses a wide class of readers. The real difference is between n = 2 and n>2. Pogorelov's method works for n>3, but requires greater technicalities".

Multidimensional case
The multi-dimensional case of the Fourth Hilbert problem was studied by Szabo. In 1986, he proved, as he wrote, the generalized Pogorelov theorem.

Theorem. Each n-dimensional Desarguesian  space  of the class , is generated by the Blaschke–Busemann construction.

A -measure that generates a flat measure has the following properties:
 the -measure of hyperplanes passing through a fixed point is equal to zero;
 the -measure of the set of hyperplanes  intersecting two segments [x, y], [y, z], where x, y та z are not collinear, is positive.

There was given the example of a flat metric not generated by the Blaschke–Busemann construction. Szabo described all continuous flat metrics in terms of generalized functions.

Hilbert's fourth problem and convex bodies
Hilbert's fourth problem is also closely related to the properties of convex bodies. A convex polyhedron is called a zonotope if it is the Minkowski sum of segments. A convex body which is a limit of zonotopes in the Blaschke – Hausdorff metric is called zonoid. For zonoids, the support function is represented by

where  is an even positive Borel measure on a sphere .

The Minkowski space is  generated by the Blaschke–Busemann construction if and only if the support function of the indicatrix has the form of (1), where  is even and not necessarily of positive Borel measure. The bodies bounded by such hypersurfaces are called generalized zonoids.

The octahedron  in the Euclidean space  is not a generalized zonoid. From the above statement it follows that the flat metric of Minkowski space with the norm  is not generated by the Blaschke–Busemann construction.

Generalizations of Hilbert's fourth problem
There was found the correspondence  between the planar n-dimensional Finsler metrics and special symplectic forms on the Grassmann manifold  в .

There were considered periodic solutions of  Hilbert's fourth problem :
 Let (M, g) be a compact locally Euclidean Riemannian manifold. Suppose that  Finsler metric on M with the same  geodesics  as in the metric g is given. Then  the Finsler metric is the sum of  a locally Minkovski metric and a closed 1-form.
 Let (M, g) be a compact symmetric Riemannian space of rank greater than one. If F is a symmetric  Finsler metric whose geodesics coincide with  geodesics of the Riemannian metric g, then (M, g) is a symmetric Finsler space. The analogue of this theorem for rank-one symmetric spaces has not been proven yet.

Another exposition of Hilbert's fourth problem can be found in work of Paiva.

Unsolved problems
 Hilbert's fourth problem  for non-symmetric Finsler metric has not yet been solved.

References

Further reading
 
 

Foundations of geometry
04